Émile Reuter (2 August 1874 – 14 February 1973) was a Luxembourgish politician. He was the 13th Prime Minister of Luxembourg, serving for six years, from 28 June 1918 until 20 March 1925.

After finishing school in 1893 at the Athénée de Luxembourg, Émile Reuter studied law in Strasbourg, Nancy and Paris from 1894 to 1898 and then registered at the bar in Luxembourg. In 1903 he became president of the Association populaire catholique and in 1911 was elected to the Chamber of Deputies. In 1914 he was a founding member of the Party of the Right. Shortly before the end of World War I, on 28 September 1918 Reuter became prime minister and Director-General (Minister) for Foreign Affairs and the Interior. In 1925 there was a crisis in the government when the Chamber rejected the government's proposals to amalgamate the railway companies Guillaume-Luxembourg and Prince-Henri under Belgian direction. The Reuter Ministry then resigned. From 1926 to 1959 (apart from the war years) he was president of the Chamber of Deputies. Until 1964 he was also the first president of the Christian Social People's Party (CSV), founded in 1944. In 1957 he became ambassador of Luxembourg to the Holy See.

He died on 14 February 1973 in Luxembourg City, aged 98. The Avenue Émile-Reuter was named after him in the city.

References 
  

|-

|-

|-

|-

Prime Ministers of Luxembourg
Ambassadors of Luxembourg to the Holy See
Ministers for Foreign Affairs of Luxembourg
Presidents of the Chamber of Deputies (Luxembourg)
Members of the Chamber of Deputies (Luxembourg)
Party of the Right (Luxembourg) politicians
Christian Social People's Party politicians
20th-century Luxembourgian lawyers
Luxembourgian people of World War I
Luxembourgian Roman Catholics
1874 births
1973 deaths
People from Luxembourg City
Alumni of the Athénée de Luxembourg